Trimen is a surname. Notable people with the surname include:

 Henry Trimen (1843–1896), British botanist
 Roland Trimen (1840–1916), British-South African naturalist